The 1979 United States Grand Prix West, formally titled the Lubri Lon Long Beach Grand Prix, was a Formula One motor race held on April 8, 1979, at Long Beach, California. Canadian Gilles Villeneuve captured pole, fastest lap and the win for Scuderia Ferrari, followed by his teammate Jody Scheckter, as the Prancing Horses took a big step toward reclaiming the Constructors' and Drivers' Championships from Team Lotus. Villeneuve's win came by almost half a minute over Scheckter, and Alan Jones joined them on the podium for Williams. It was the third win of Villeneuve's career, his second in succession, and the third United States Grand Prix win in a row for Ferrari.

Summary
Qualifying was a battle between Ferrari, Lotus and Ligier, and, as is usually the case at Long Beach, the circuit was littered with broken cars by the end of each session. Carlos Reutemann, in the second Lotus, held the pole until the very end of the final session, when Villeneuve bumped him.

With only Ferrari and Renault on Michelin tires, Villeneuve was able to use seven sets of qualifiers in the final session, while the Goodyear runners had only two sets per car. On his final charge, Villeneuve switched off his rev limiter at the end of the straight, raising the revs by 200 to 12,600 and giving him enough extra speed to pip Reutemann by six hundredths of a second. Scheckter was third, ahead of the two Ligiers of Patrick Depailler and Jacques Laffite, then Mario Andretti in sixth.

On Saturday morning, Jean-Pierre Jabouille had a driveshaft on his Renault break on the curving back "straight," flinging him into the wall at 180 mph. A badly sprained arm would keep him out of the race. Then, in the Sunday morning warmup, a stronger version of the driveshaft, produced by the team in the garage, broke on teammate René Arnoux's car. Rather than taking a chance on duplicating Jabouille's incident, the team withdrew their remaining car from the race, allowing Derek Daly's Ensign onto the starting grid.

100,000 fans gathered on Sunday, which turned sunny and warm just in time for the race. As with the previous year, the start would be on the Shoreline Drive straight, rather than in front of the pits, giving the drivers more of a run down to the first corner. On the warmup lap preceding the drive around to the grid, Reutemann's engine cut out, and he had to be helped back to the pits. The problem was quickly solved, and, while the organizers ruled that he must start from the back of the grid, Reutemann ignored the officials and went back out.

The cars made their way around for the start on Shoreline Drive, and, as they approached the grid markings, pole-sitter Villeneuve drove right past his starting position! This confused the entire field, who were taking their cue from Villeneuve. Some actually thought the race had started, and everyone ended up back at the pits! On the way to the grid, Laffite's Ligier had suddenly slid across the track when the back end seized. He was allowed to switch to his spare car and, when they finally got under way, he started the race from the pits with Reutemann. After only eight laps, Laffite retired with overheated brakes, and Reutemann broke a driveshaft after just 21, so two of the top five qualifiers were out early, and the door was wide open for the Ferraris.

At the end of one full lap, Villeneuve led Depailler, Scheckter, Jean-Pierre Jarier,
Andretti, Riccardo Patrese, Jones and Nelson Piquet. Villeneuve got to the first corner ahead of Scheckter and quickly began to draw away. Scheckter lost a position to Depailler on the first half lap, but began pushing hard to take back second place. When Depailler missed a gear, Scheckter nearly hit him in the back, and Jarier slipped his Tyrrell past both of them. On the next lap, Scheckter also got around Depailler, whose troubles with fourth gear would last the entire race.

Villeneuve continued to run untroubled in the lead, expanding his margin whenever he chose and setting the race's fastest lap before half-distance. The battle for second, however, was fierce as Jarier, Scheckter, Depailler, Andretti and Jones formed a massive train. Jarier was fighting a wheel vibration and holding everyone up, but no one could pass him on the straight.

On lap 28, Scheckter got by the struggling Tyrrell, but it was not until laps 45 and 46, respectively, that Depailler and Jones could follow. By that time, Scheckter had a cushion of nearly twenty seconds back to Depailler in third. With the Ligier still struggling, Jones moved into third place on lap 63. This left Andretti behind Depailler and the two traded positions several times, the Lotus able to go through in the curvy sections, while the Ligier continually repassed on the straight. Finally, as Depailler attempted to lap Jarier, now in sixth spot, he bent his front wing against Jarier's wheel, and Andretti was able to take hold of fourth place for good.

Depailler's persistence was rewarded with a hard-earned fifth place, and Jarier inherited sixth when Héctor Rebaque, having come from twenty-third to the points, collided with Daly while trying to lap him in the esses.

It was the second win of the season for Villeneuve and put him on top of the Driver's standings.

Classification

Qualifying

Race

Championship standings after the race

Drivers' Championship standings

Constructors' Championship standings

Note: Only the top five positions are included for both sets of standings.

References

Further reading
 Rob Walker (July, 1979). "4th United States Grand Prix West: Runaway Horses". Road & Track, 82-87.

United States Grand Prix West
United States Grand Prix West
United States Grand Prix West
Grand Prix West
Grand Prix West